Phil Dike (1906-1990) was an American painter and art teacher. He painted watercolors, and he taught at Scripps College and the Claremont Graduate University. His work is in the permanent collections of the Metropolitan Museum of Art, the National Academy of Design, and the Library of Congress.

Further reading

References

1906 births
1990 deaths
People from Redlands, California
Chouinard Art Institute alumni
American watercolorists
Painters from California
Scripps College faculty
Claremont Graduate University faculty
20th-century American painters